List of champions of the 1901 U.S. National Championships tennis tournament (now known as the US Open). The men's tournament was held from 19 August to 27 August on the outdoor grass courts at the Newport Casino in Newport, Rhode Island. The women's tournament was held from 25 June to 29 June on the outdoor grass courts at the Philadelphia Cricket Club in Philadelphia, Pennsylvania. It was the 21st U.S. National Championships and the second Grand Slam tournament of the year.

Finals

Men's singles

 William Larned defeated  Beals Wright  6–2, 6–8, 6–4, 6–4

Women's singles

 Elisabeth Moore defeated  Myrtle McAteer  6–4, 3–6, 7–5, 2–6, 6–2

Men's doubles
 Holcombe Ward /  Dwight Davis defeated  Leo Ware /  Beals Wright 6–3, 9–7, 6–11

Women's doubles
 Juliette Atkinson /  Myrtle McAteer defeated  Marion Jones /  Elisabeth Moore default

Mixed doubles
 Marion Jones /  Raymond Little defeated  Myrtle McAteer /  Clyde Stevens 6–4, 6–4, 7–5

References

External links
Official US Open website

 
U.S. National Championships
U.S. National Championships (tennis) by year
U.S. National Championships
U.S. National Championships (tennis)
U.S. National Championships (tennis)
U.S. National Championships (tennis)
U.S. National Championships (tennis)